J.C. Newman Cigar Company was established in 1895 and is the oldest family-owned premium cigar maker in the United States. It was founded in Cleveland, Ohio by Julius Caeser Newman, a Hungarian immigrant. The business relocated to a historic 1910 cigar factory (Regensburg cigar factory) in the Cigar City of Ybor City, Florida in 1954. The family business is now in its fourth generation of Newman ownership.

Company overview
J.C. Newman Cigar Company manufactures and distributes premium cigars. As a Hungarian immigrant, J.C. Newman rolled his first cigars in the family barn in Cleveland in 1895. In 1954, the company moved to Tampa's Ybor City cigar district to be closer to Cuba. J.C. Newman is also the worldwide distributor for Arturo Fuente cigars, except for Western Europe. Today, J.C. Newman's cigars are sold in 81 countries around the world.

Cigar brands

Dominican Republic cigars
Cuesta-Rey
Diamond Crown
Diamond Crown Black Diamond
Diamond Crown Maximus
Diamond Crown Julius Caeser
La Unica

Nicaraguan cigars
Alcazar
El Baton
Brick House
Don Jose
Don Seville
HavanaQ
Quorum
Perla Del Mar
Yagua

United States cigars
Decision
Factory Firsts
Factory Throwouts
Rigoletto
Tampa Trolleys
The American
Trader Jacks

Humidors and cigar accessories
 Diamond Crown, made by Reed & Barton
 Craftsman's Bench

Historic facts

 J.C. Newman was the first to package cigars in cellophane tubes, now an industry standard, to protect cigars and keep them fresh.
 J.C. Newman was a director of the Cigar Manufacturers Association of American in the 1940s. 
 After the United States embargo against Cuba began, J.C. Newman introduced Cameroon tobacco to the United States.
 The Cuesta-Rey Cigar Bar at Tropicana Field, home of the Tampa Bay Rays, was the first cigar bar in Major League Baseball.
 J.C. Newman operates cigar museum  on the first floor of its historic Tampa factory.
 In 2001, the Newman family joined the Fuente family in creating the Cigar Family Charitable Foundation, a 501(c)(3) non-profit organization that has raised over $3 million to build schools, medical clinics, farms, and sports and recreation facilities to help the poor children of the Dominican Republic.
 J.C. Newman utilizes antique, hand-operated ARENCO and American Machine and Foundry cigarmaking machines from the 1930's in its Tampa factory.

References

External links
Cigar Family -- Official Website
Cigar Aficionado Interview with Stanford J. Newman
100 Years of Cigar Making
J.C. Newman Official Website -- Company History

Manufacturing companies established in 1895
Tobacco companies of the United States
Cigar manufacturing companies
History of Cleveland
Companies based in Tampa, Florida
1895 establishments in Ohio
Family-owned companies of the United States